Justin Lee may refer to:

 Justin Lee (activist) (born 1977), founder of the Gay Christian Network, now known as Q Christian Fellowship
 Justin Lee (actor) (born 1989), Korean-American actor
 Justin Lee (diplomat), Australian High Commissioner to Bangladesh
 Justin Lee (footballer) (born 1990), Guamanian football player
 Justin Lee Collins (born 1974), English media personality
 Changjoon Justin Lee, neuroscientist specializing in glioscience

See also
 Justin Lee sex scandal (born 1985), sexual assaults in Taiwan